The 1976 Louisville Cardinals football team was an American football team that represented the University of Louisville as an independent during the 1976 NCAA Division I football season. In their second season under head coach Vince Gibson, the Cardinals compiled a 4–7 record and were outscored by a total of 234 to 177.

The team's statistical leaders included Stu Stram with 394 passing yards, Calvin Prince with 1,028 rushing yards and 60 points scored, and Ebb Williams with 165 receiving yards.

Schedule

References

Louisville
Louisville Cardinals football seasons
Louisville Cardinals football